Binnypet was one of the 224 constituencies in the Karnataka Legislative Assembly of Karnataka a south state of India. It was a part of Bangalore North Lok Sabha constituency.

Member of Legislative Assembly

Mysore State
 1951-1978: Seat did not exist

Karnataka State
 1978: I. P. D Salappa, Indian National Congress (Indira)
 1983: G. Narayana Kumar, Janata Party
 1985: G. Narayana Kumar, Janata Party
 1989: Naseer Ahmed, Indian National Congress
 1994: V. Somanna, Janata Dal
 1999: V. Somanna, Independent
 2004: V. Somanna, Indian National Congress
 2008 onwards: Seat does not exist. See Govindraj Nagar and Vijay Nagar

See also
 Bangalore Urban district
 List of constituencies of Karnataka Legislative Assembly

References

Former assembly constituencies of Karnataka
Bangalore Urban district